The 2018 Le Gruyère AOP European Curling Championships were held from November 16 to 24 in Tallinn, Estonia. The C Division competitions were held in April in Copenhagen, Denmark.

The top seven men's teams will qualify for the 2019 World Men's Curling Championship. Additionally, the top two teams in the B division and the top two teams in the A division not already qualified for the World Men's Curling Championship will qualify for the 2019 World Qualification Event, a further chance to qualify for the Worlds.

The top six women's teams, not including the hosts, Denmark, who automatically qualify, will qualify for the 2019 World Women's Curling Championship. Additionally, the top two teams in the B division and the top two teams in the A division not already qualified for the World Women's Curling Championship will qualify for the 2019 World Qualification Event, a further chance to qualify for the Worlds.

Men

A Division

Teams

Round-robin standings
Final round-robin standings

Round-robin results

Draw 1
Saturday, November 17, 09:00

Draw 3
Saturday, November 17, 20:00

Draw 5
Sunday, November 18, 14:00

Draw 7
Monday, November 19, 08:00

Draw 9
Monday, November 19, 16:00

Draw 11
Tuesday, November 20, 09:00

Draw 13
Tuesday, November 20, 19:00

Draw 15
Wednesday, November 21, 14:00

Draw 17
Thursday, November 22, 09:00

Playoffs

Semi-finals
Thursday, November 22, 19:00

Bronze medal game
Friday, November 23, 19:00

Gold medal game
Saturday, November 24, 15:00

Player percentages
Round Robin only

B Division

Round-robin standings

Relegation round

Playoffs

Qualification games
Friday, November 23, 08:30

Semi-finals
Friday, November 23, 14:00

Bronze medal game
Friday, November 23, 20:00

Gold medal game
Friday, November 23, 20:00

C Division

Round-robin standings

Playoffs

1 vs. 2

Winner advances to Group B competitions.
Loser advances to Second place game.

3 vs. 4

Winner advances to Second place game.

Second place game

Winner advances to Group B competitions.

Women

A Division

Teams

Round-robin standings
Final round-robin standings

{| 
|valign=top width=10%|

Round-robin results

Draw 2
Saturday, November 17, 15:00

Draw 4
Sunday, November 18, 09:00

Draw 6
Sunday, November 18, 19:00

Draw 8
Monday, November 19, 12:00

Draw 10
Monday, November 19, 20:00

Draw 12
Tuesday, November 20, 14:00

Draw 14
Wednesday, November 21, 09:00

Draw 16
Wednesday, November 21, 19:00

Draw 18
Thursday, November 22, 14:00

Playoffs

Semi-finals
Friday, November 23, 14:00

Bronze medal game
Friday, November 23, 19:00

Gold medal game
Saturday, November 24, 10:00

Player percentages
Round Robin only

B Division

Round-robin standings

Playoffs

Semi-finals
Friday, November 23, 08:30

Bronze medal game
Friday, November 23, 20:00

Gold medal game
Friday, November 23, 20:00

C Division

Round-robin standings

 Withdrew from the tournament before the first draw began.

Playoffs

1 vs. 2

Winner advances to Group B competitions.
Loser advances to Second place game.

3 vs. 4

Winner advances to Second place game.

Second place game

Winner advances to Group B competitions.

References

External links

European
European Curling Championships
International curling competitions hosted by Estonia
Sports competitions in Tallinn
European Curling
European Curling Championships